Edward Dafydd (died 1690), also known as Edward David, was a 17th-century Welsh poet from Margam, Glamorganshire.

Prominence
By some Dafydd was considered the most prominent Glamorganshire bard of the 17th century. According to Iolo Morganwg, he was tutored by Llywelyn Siôn, who dwelt in Laleston, a neighbouring parish. None of his work is thought to have been produced after 1665.

Dafydd is believed to have been admitted as a graduate of the gathering known as Gorsedd Morganwg in 1620. In 1660, he served as its President. He died in 1690.

References

Welsh male poets
17th-century Welsh poets
1690 deaths
Year of birth unknown
Date of birth unknown
Date of death unknown
People from Glamorgan
17th-century male writers